This page lists national football team statistics regarding Bosnia 1992 – present, and also some statistics from Yugoslavia 1920–1990 period relevant to SRBiH.

Recent results and forthcoming fixtures

Player records

All scorers Bosnian national football team 
Table correct as of 4 September 2020.

All appearances for Bosnian national football team 
Table correct as of 26 March 2014

Not included unofficial matches: BiH-Uruguay, BiH-Chile, BiH-Slovakia, BiH-Malaysia U23, BiH-South Africa

All Bosnian scorers at Major Competitions (Bosnia 1992 – present)

Bosnian players at Major Competitions (Yugoslavia 1920–1990)

2+ BiH players playing at the same club

The table below lists notable instances of two or more Bosnian football team players in one foreign based club at the same time:

Note: Table contains some of the more prominent club sides of the world. Table does not yet contain clubs from other former Yugoslavia republics.

Youngest debutants
As of 7 June 2016, the youngest debutants for senior Bosnia-Herzegovina side are:

Match statistics

Biggest wins
Wins by five goals and up

Hat-tricks for Bosnia

The table below shows a list of Bosnia and Herzegovina players who scored three or more goals in one match.

Hat-tricks conceded by Bosnia

The table below shows a list of opponent players who scored three or more goals in one match against Bosnia and Herzegovina.

Memorable victories
Source: Results
 Unofficial games not included.

Major Tournaments appearances and play-offs appearances

 Bosnia and Herzegovina was the first former Yugoslav nation to qualify for a FIFA World Cup directly, and not via play-offs first;
 Tino-Sven Sušić played for Bosnia at 2014 FIFA World Cup under his uncle - head coach Safet Sušić.

Play-offs win–draw–loss stats

Major Tournament win–draw–loss stats

Head-to-Head records against other countries
Tables correct as of match played on 1 June 2018.

The table lists opponents played, sorted by members of FIFA affiliated confederations.

Bosnia and Herzegovina's all-time record sorted by FIFA Confederations, 1995–present

Matches vs Ex-Yugoslav Republics
Bosnia and Herzegovina was one of six republics of Socialist Federal Republic of Yugoslavia. As such, meeting one of its neighbor republics on the sports pitch is of great significance.

Penalty shootout record

Managers and captains

Captains
Emir Spahić captained Bosnia at their first ever FIFA World Cup tournament.
This is a list of Bosnia and Herzegovina captains for ten or more matches.

Note: Some of the other players to have captained the team include: Mehmed Baždarević (2 caps) 1996, Meho Kodro (5) 1997 to 1998, Vlatko Glavaš (1) 1997, Suvad Katana (2) 1998, Elvir Bolić (6) 1999 to 2000, Bruno Akrapović (4) 1999 to 2003, Hasan Salihamidžić (1) 2004, Zlatan Bajramović (1) 2006, Džemal Berberović (1) 2007, Asmir Begović (6) 2011 to 2020, Haris Medunjanin (4) 2016 to 2018, Vedad Ibišević (1) 2017, Miralem Pjanić (6) 2019 to 2021, Ermin Bičakčić (1) 2019, Sead Kolašinac (1) 2021, Ibrahim Šehić (1) 2021, Siniša Saničanin (1) 2021, Eldar Ćivić (1) 2021, Adnan Kovačević (1) 2021, Ajdin Nukić (1) 2021.

Table correct as of prior match played in March 2022.

Notable national team managers born in Bosnia and Herzegovina 

Table correct as of 8 October 2020. List ONLY includes managers of senior national teams originating from Bosnia who have worked overseas and/or who have had national team success. Does not include managers of junior sides. Also the list does not include assistant to national coach managers.

 * Mladen Krstajić was born in Zenica, took over an already qualified Serbia to 2018 FIFA World Cup from Slavoljub Muslin.

 ** Miroslav Blažević was born in Travnik, Kingdom of Yugoslavia (present day Bosnia), but lived most of his life in Zagreb, Croatia. He is considered to be both Bosnian and/or Croatian manager having managed clubs from both nations, including their national teams.

Home venues record 
(Bosnia 1992 – present)
Table correct as of 19 Nov 2015.

Notable match formations

FIFA World Rankings

BiH Ranking Evolution
From April 1996 – March 2014

Yearly averages
FIFA ranking yearly averages for Bosnia and Herzegovina:

Bosnia and Herzegovina's average position since the FIFA World Ranking's creation is 58.

See also

List of international goals scored by Edin Džeko
The Bosnian footballer of the year award – Idol of the nation

References

External links
N/FSBIH
Bosnia-Herzegovina on FIFA.com
Bosnia-Herzegovina on UEFA.com

Statistics
National association football team records and statistics